This is a list of electoral results for the electoral district of Esperance-Dundas in Western Australian state elections.

Members for Esperance-Dundas

Election results

Elections in the 1980s

References

Western Australian state electoral results by district